Ronald Koppelent (born 30 November 1955 in Linz, Austria) is an Austrian figure skater who competed in men's singles. He is a four-time (1974–77) Austrian national champion and competed at the 1976 Winter Olympics.

Competitive highlights

References

Austrian male single skaters
1955 births
Olympic figure skaters of Austria
Figure skaters at the 1976 Winter Olympics
Living people